The Roman Catholic Church in Chad is composed of 1 ecclesiastical province with 6 suffragan dioceses.

List of Dioceses

Episcopal Conference of Chad

Ecclesiastical Province of N'Djamena
Archdiocese of N'Djamena
Diocese of Doba
Diocese of Goré
Diocese of Lai
Diocese of Moundou
Diocese of Pala
Diocese of Sarh

Immediately subject to the Holy See 
Apostolic Vicariate of Mongo

External links 
Catholic-Hierarchy entry.
GCatholic.org.

Chad
Catholic dioceses